Sir John Richard Harrison  (23 May 1921 – 5 September 2003) was a New Zealand politician. After serving in a number of capacities in the National Party, he served as Speaker of the House of Representatives from 1978 to 1984.

Early life
Harrison was born in Hastings, New Zealand, on 23 May 1921. He was educated at Wanganui Collegiate School and Canterbury University, from where he graduated with a Bachelor of Arts. During World War II, Harrison served in the army, and saw active service in Italy. He remained in the army for several years after the war. After leaving the military, he established himself as a farmer, although remained active as an army reservist. He served as commander of the reservist Hawke's Bay Regiment from 1956 to 1959.

In 1948, he married Margaret Kelly, the daughter of E. J. Kelly. They had three sons and one daughter.

Political career

In the 1963 election, Harrison stood for Parliament in the electorate of Hawke's Bay, and was successful. He served as a National Party backbencher for six years. After the 1969 election, he was made Junior Whip, and was Chairman of Committees in 1972, and again from 1976 to 1978. In 1978, he was elected Speaker after the death of Roy Jack. His Speakership ended at the 1984 election, when National Government lost, and when Harrison lost the election in the Hawke's Bay electorate to Bill Sutton.

In the 1980 Queen's Birthday Honours, Harrison was appointed a Knight Bachelor, two years after becoming speaker.

Death
Harrison died on 5 September 2003.

Notes

References

|-

|-

1921 births
2003 deaths
New Zealand Army personnel
New Zealand farmers
New Zealand military personnel of World War II
New Zealand National Party MPs
People from Hastings, New Zealand
Speakers of the New Zealand House of Representatives
Members of the New Zealand House of Representatives
People educated at Whanganui Collegiate School
Unsuccessful candidates in the 1984 New Zealand general election
New Zealand MPs for North Island electorates
New Zealand Knights Bachelor
New Zealand politicians awarded knighthoods
New Zealand expatriates in Italy